Iner Sontany Putra (born 1 May 1995) is an Indonesian footballer who plays as a midfielder.

Club career

Željezničar Banja Luka
On 20 August 2021, he signed a contract to play for First League of the Republika Srpska club Željezničar Banja Luka.

Honours

Club
Indera
 Brunei Super Cup: 2018

References

External links
 
 Iner Sontany Putra at Liga Indonesia

1995 births
Living people
Sportspeople from Jakarta
Indonesian footballers
Association football midfielders
Indonesian Premier Division players
Liga 2 (Indonesia) players
Persitara Jakarta Utara players
PSIM Yogyakarta players
Mitra Kukar players
DIT FC players
Indera SC players
Lalenok United F.C. players
FK Željezničar Banja Luka players
Indonesian expatriate footballers
Indonesian expatriate sportspeople in East Timor
Indonesian expatriate sportspeople in Brunei
Indonesian expatriate sportspeople in Bosnia and Herzegovina
Expatriate footballers in East Timor
Expatriate footballers in Brunei
Expatriate footballers in Bosnia and Herzegovina